Unni Elisabeth Bernhoft (born 4 March 1933) is a Norwegian actress and tobacco retailer.

Personal life
Bernhoft was born in Oslo to singer and revue writer Bias Bernhoft and Margit Haug, and is a granddaughter of Tobias Bernhoft. She is married to actor Bjørn Sand, and is the mother of television producer and executive Jon Ola Sand.

Career
Bernhoft made her stage debut at Chat Noir in 1953, in the revue Katten er løs. Her film appearances include Bedre enn sitt rykte (1955),  (1957), Fjols til fjells (1957), Støv på hjernen (1959), and Millionær for en aften (1960). In the comedy Fjols til fjells she played the character "Ruth Granberg," opposite Leif Juster as "Poppe." Until 2002 Fjols til fjells was the fourth-most-viewed Norwegian film of all time. Her best known song recording is probably Lille Frøken Stang from 1955. She gave voice to the character "Vips" (Red Fraggle) in the Norwegian dub of Fraggle Rock.

References

1933 births
Living people
Actresses from Oslo
Norwegian stage actresses
Norwegian film actresses
20th-century Norwegian women singers
20th-century Norwegian singers